Convento de Santa Clara is a defunct convent located on Calle del Rey Heredia in Córdoba, Andalusia, Spain. Situated in the historic centre, it was the first convent in the city after the Reconquista of October 1265. It was built atop a Muslim mosque dating to 976 which, in turn, had been built on the Basilica of Santa Catalina, in the 6th century. The minaret, re-fashioned into a bell-tower, and the building's Calle Osio portal date to this period. The convent was initially situated within the mosque and had eight nuns. Throughout its history, it went by various names. Originally known Santa Catalina, it became "Santa Clara" after installation of the Poor Clares; it was also known as "Santa Isabel" during a time of tribute to Isabella of France who had strong ties to the Spanish Crown. The religious order was incorporated to Santa Cruz in 1868, when the convent was abandoned. The minaret/bell tower was declared a Bien de Interés Cultural site in 1931. Muslim towers, battlements, and a staircase have been retained.

Situated within the defunct convent is the Church of St Catherine (Catalina) which was to a design of a slightly irregular Greek Cross, and measured . The east-facing sanctuary contains remains of a mosaic.

References

External links
 

Convents in Spain
Roman Catholic churches in Córdoba, Spain
Bien de Interés Cultural landmarks in the Province of Córdoba (Spain)
Historic centre of Córdoba, Spain